Žan Celar (born 14 March 1999) is a Slovenian footballer who plays as a forward for Lugano.

Club career
Celar made his Serie A debut for Roma on 11 March 2019 in a game against Empoli, as an 86th-minute substitute for Patrik Schick.

On 10 July 2019, Celar joined Serie B club Cittadella on loan until January 2020. On 30 January 2020, he moved on loan to Cremonese. After scoring two goals in eleven appearances during the 2019–20 Serie B season, his loan was extended for another season in August 2020.

On 15 May 2022, Celar scored a goal in Lugano's 4–1 victory over St. Gallen in the final of the Swiss Cup.

International career
Between 2014 and 2021, Celar was capped for all Slovenian youth selections from under-16 to under-21, making 46 appearances for all teams and scoring 17 goals.

He made his debut for the senior team on 14 November 2021 in a World Cup qualifying match against Cyprus.

Career statistics

Club

Honours
Lugano
Swiss Cup: 2021–22

References

External links

NZS profile 

1999 births
Living people
Sportspeople from Kranj
Slovenian footballers
Slovenian expatriate footballers
Slovenia youth international footballers
Slovenia under-21 international footballers
Slovenia international footballers
Association football forwards
NK Maribor players
A.S. Roma players
A.S. Cittadella players
U.S. Cremonese players
FC Lugano players
Slovenian PrvaLiga players
Serie A players
Serie B players
Swiss Super League players
Slovenian expatriate sportspeople in Italy
Expatriate footballers in Italy
Slovenian expatriate sportspeople in Switzerland
Expatriate footballers in Switzerland